Safi may refer to:

People
Safi (given name), an Arabic name
Safi (Pashtun tribe)
Safi of Persia (1611–1642), a Safavid shah of Iran
Omid Safi, an Iranian-American writer

Places
Ghor as-Safi or as-Safi, a town in Jordan; see Zoara

Safi, Malta
Safi, Morocco
Olympic Club de Safi, an association football club
Safi Subdivision, Mohmand District, Khyber Pakhtunkhwa, Pakistan

Other uses
Safi Airways, an Afghan Airline based in Dubai
Safi (medicine), an Unani herbal medicine
Pasta Zara-Cogeas, an UCI women's cycling team formerly named Safi-Pasta Zara and variations 
, a German cargo ship in service 1956-60
Southeast Asia Food Inc., a former name of NutriAsia